Patrick Marshall (born 11 March 1946) is a Trinidadian sprinter. He competed in the men's 4 × 400 metres relay at the 1972 Summer Olympics.

Competition record

References

1946 births
Living people
Athletes (track and field) at the 1972 Summer Olympics
Trinidad and Tobago male sprinters
Olympic athletes of Trinidad and Tobago